Campbell Chapel African Methodist Episcopal Church is a historic African Methodist Episcopal church located at 602 Commerce Street in Glasgow, Howard County, Missouri.  It was built in 1865, and is a small one-story, vernacular brick building with simple Greek Revival style design elements.  The rectangular building measures 32 feet by 52 feet and features a stepped gable and six brick pilasters.

It was listed on the National Register of Historic Places in 1997.

References

African Methodist Episcopal churches in Missouri
Greek Revival church buildings in Missouri
Churches completed in 1865
Churches on the National Register of Historic Places in Missouri
Buildings and structures in Howard County, Missouri
National Register of Historic Places in Howard County, Missouri